Dane Trbović (Serbian Cyrillic: Дaнe Tpбoвић ; born 15 April 1986 in Belgrade) is a Serbian football defender currently playing with FK Cement Beočin.

He had previously played with FK Vojvodina in the First League of Serbia and Montenegro and Hungarian First League club Diósgyőri VTK among other lower league clubs in Serbia.

References
 Profile and stats from Serbia at Srbijafudbal.
 Profile at HLSZ.

1986 births
Living people
Footballers from Belgrade
Serbian footballers
FK Mačva Šabac players
FK Vojvodina players
FK Cement Beočin players
FK Voždovac players
Serbian SuperLiga players
Diósgyőri VTK players
Expatriate footballers in Hungary
Association football defenders